Viktor Aleksandrovich Vesnin (April 9, 1882 – September 17, 1950), was a Russian Empire and Soviet architect. His early works (1909–1915) follow the canon of Neoclassicist Revival; in the 1920s, he and his brothers Leonid (1880–1933) and Alexander (1883–1959) emerged as leaders of Constructivist architecture, the Vesnin brothers. After the crackdown on Constructivism in 1931-32 and until his death, Viktor Vesnin was the highest-ranked architect in Soviet system, heading the Union of Soviet Architects and Academy of Architecture. As a lead architect for heavy construction, he supervised many industrial projects, but his own visionary drafts of this period never materialized.

Selected work

1934 People's Commissariat of Heavy Industry Project
1927-1932 DnieproGES, with Nikolai Kolli
1930 Palace of Culture of the Proletarsky district, Moscow
1928 House of Film Actors, Moscow
1926 Mostorg department store, Moscow
1924 Leningradskaya Pravda project
1922-23 Palace of Labor project
1915 Sirotkin House, Nizhny Novgorod
1914 Mantashev Stables, Moscow Racetrack (with A.G.Izmirov, Alexander Vesnin)

References

External links
 Viktor Aleksandrovich Vesnin, photographs, Canadian Centre for Architecture (digitzed items)

1882 births
1950 deaths
People from Ivanovo Oblast
Academicians of the USSR Academy of Architecture
Academic staff of Bauman Moscow State Technical University
Full Members of the USSR Academy of Sciences
First convocation members of the Soviet of Nationalities
Second convocation members of the Soviet of Nationalities
Recipients of the Order of Lenin
Recipients of the Order of the Red Banner of Labour
Recipients of the Royal Gold Medal
Architects from the Russian Empire
Constructivist architects
Modernist architects
Soviet avant-garde
Soviet architects
Burials at Novodevichy Cemetery